Abraham Morris (1752 – 13 February 1822) was an Irish banker.

He sat in the Irish House of Commons for County Cork from 1791 to 1797. Morris was involved in a feud with Art Ó Laoghaire, and ordered Ó Laoghaire's death in 1773. The Irish lament Caoineadh Airt Uí Laoghaire, was composed by Ó Laoghaire's widow Eibhlín Dubh Ní Chonaill about his murder.

References

1752 births
1822 deaths
Alumni of Trinity College Dublin
Members of the Middle Temple
Irish barristers
Irish bankers
High Sheriffs of County Cork
Irish MPs 1790–1797
Members of the Parliament of Ireland (pre-1801) for County Cork constituencies